The Sri Lanka women's national under-16 basketball team is the national basketball team of Sri Lanka for Junior Women, governed by the Sri Lanka Basketball Federation. It represents the country in international under-16 women's basketball competitions.

Current roster
Sri Lanka roster at the 5th FIBA Under-16 Women's Asian Championship:

See also
Sri Lanka women's national basketball team
Sri Lanka women's national under-18 basketball team

References

External links
Sri Lanka Basketball Records at FIBA Archive

U-16
Women's national under-16 basketball teams